Dawn Porter is an American documentary filmmaker and founder of production company Trilogy Films.

Early life and education
Porter is a graduate of the Bronx High School of Science, Swarthmore College (in 1988) and Georgetown University Law School. Trained as an attorney, she became a filmmaker and financed her first film with assistance from the Ford Foundation.

Career

Porter started her film career by working as executive producer for various films. In 2009, she executive-produced director Jon Bowermaster's Terra Antarctica, Re-Discovering the Seventh Continent, a 49-minute documentary exploring the Antarctica Peninsula and its evolution. In 2009, she also co-executive produced two other films: Serious Moonlight, and What Would Darwin Think? Man v. Nature in the Galapagos. In 2011, she co-executive produced The Green, a romantic drama feature film directed by Steven Williford.

Porter's directorial debut was the 2013 documentary film Gideon's Army, about three black public defenders working in the American Deep South. The film premiered at the Sundance Film Festival in 2013, where it won the festival's "Documentary Editing Award". The film also won the Creative Promise Award at the 2013 Sundance Film Festival. Gideon’s Army premiered on HBO in July 2013, and was later nominated for an Emmy Award, and an Independent Spirit Award for Best Documentary Feature. The film also won the Ridenhour Award for best documentary film in 2014.

Porter's second film project was Spies of Mississippi, which debuted on PBS in 2014. It is 53-minute documentary shot in black and white about Mississippi State Sovereignty Commission (MSSC) efforts to preserve segregation during the 1950s and 1960s, including the use of an extensive spy network and violent cover-ups. The film was written by Rick Bowers and directed by Porter.

Trapped, Porter's third  film, premiered at Sundance Film Festival in 2016. It shows the impact of anti-abortion laws on abortion providers in the South along with chronicling the last remaining abortion clinic in Mississippi. Porter says she decided it was her duty to make this film, after witnessing there was only one abortion clinic in the entire state of Mississippi. The title of the documentary was derived from the term TRAP Laws ("Targeted Regulation of Abortion Providers"), which have led to the closure of hundreds of southern US clinics mainly in areas that service poor women and women of color. Due to the film's potent subject matter on abortion, police were hired to stand guard outside screenings, and to check for weapons at the door.

She also produced a biography of Chef Alexandra Guarnaschelli for the Cooking Channel.

Filmography

See also
African American cinema

References

External links

Living people
Year of birth missing (living people)
American documentary filmmakers
American film directors
African-American film directors
Georgetown University Law Center alumni
Swarthmore College alumni
American women documentary filmmakers
The Bronx High School of Science alumni
21st-century African-American people
21st-century African-American women